Estelle Mary (Jo) Sweatman (1872-1956), was an Australian painter. She was a founding member of the Twenty Melbourne Painters Society.

Biography

Sweatman was born in South Yarra 1872. She took drawing classes at a suburban ladies' college, and was recommended by her teacher to join the National Gallery School, where she studied for two years under Frederick McCubbin. She also studied painting while at the school with Bernard Hall. Sweatman was initially involved with the Victorian Artists' Society but her support for Max Meldrum eventually led to her being ousted along with friend A.M.E. Bale. She started her career painting portraits but eventually found the lure of nature led her towards landscapes. Building her house 'The Kipsy' next door to fellow artist Clara Southern, they both took an active role in developing the artistic community in Warrandyte, Victoria. She helped establish annual art exhibitions with the Warrandyte Women's Auxiliary Association, serving on a committee of resident artists as secretary.

She was a founding member of the group, Twenty Melbourne Painters Society, that was formed by students and followers of Australian Tonalist Max Meldrum. Sweatman was considered to be one of Australia's most famous painters of wattle. She has works in the collections of the Hamilton Gallery, Castlemaine Art Museum, and the National Gallery of Victoria. 

In 1922 Sweatman was a finalist for the Archibald Prize for her Portrait Miss A.M.E. Bale. The same year A.M.E. Bale was a finalist with her portrait of Miss Jo Sweatman. Sweatman died in 1956.

Exhibitions 

 South Australian Society of Arts 9th annual exhibition, November 1906
 Victorian Artists' Society 18th annual exhibition, East Melbourne Galleries, October 1913
 Group exhibition, Athenaeum Gallery, July 1919
 Australian Art Association annual exhibition, Athenaeum Gallery, 1 - 15 October, 1920
 Group exhibition (Jo Sweatman, A.M.E. Bale, Bernice Edwell), Athenaeum Gallery, November 1923
 Twenty Melbourne Painters Society, Queen's Hall, November 1924
 Twenty Melbourne Painters Society, Athenaeum Gallery, 15 - 29 September 1925
 Solo exhibition, Decoration Gallery, May 1926 (catalogue)
 Twenty Melbourne Painters Society 8th annual exhibition, Athenaeum Gallery, 14 - 25 September 1926
 Jo Sweatman & A.M.E. Bale, Athenaeum Gallery, 28 March - 9 April 1927
 Twenty Melbourne Painters Society 10th annual exhibition, Athenaeum Gallery, September 1928
 Twenty Melbourne Painters Society 11th annual exhibition, 24 September - 5 October 1929
 Solo exhibition, Athenaeum Gallery, April 1929
 Australian landscapes, Athenaeum Gallery, 9 - 20 May, 1933
 Solo exhibition, Athenaeum Gallery, 30 April - 11 May 1935 (catalogue)
Solo exhibition, Athenaeum Gallery, May 1937 (catalogue)
 Solo exhibition, Athenaeum Gallery, 18 - 29 May 1943
 Solo exhibition, Athenaeum Gallery, 22 May - 2 June 1945
 Twenty Melbourne Painters Society, Athenaeum Gallery, 3 - 14 September 1946
 Solo exhibition, Athenaeum Gallery, May 1947

References

External links
Resources for Jo Sweatman on Trove, National Library of Australia 
Images of Jo Sweatman's paintings on MutualArt
Jo Sweatman Australian art and artists file, State Library Victoria
Jo Sweatman [manuscript] biography by Margaret Stephensen, State Library Victoria

1872 births
1956 deaths
20th-century Australian women artists
20th-century Australian artists
19th-century Australian women artists
Australian artists
Archibald Prize finalists
People from South Yarra, Victoria
Artists from Melbourne
National Gallery of Victoria Art School alumni